was a Japanese mathematician known for the Taniyama–Shimura conjecture.

Contribution
Taniyama was best known for conjecturing, in modern language, automorphic properties of L-functions of elliptic curves over any number field. A partial and refined case of this conjecture for elliptic curves over rationals is called the Taniyama–Shimura conjecture or the modularity theorem whose statement he subsequently refined in collaboration with Goro Shimura. The names Taniyama, Shimura and Weil have all been attached to this conjecture, but the idea is essentially due to Taniyama.

“Taniyama's interests were in algebraic number theory and his fame is mainly due to two problems posed by him at the symposium on Algebraic Number Theory held in Tokyo and Nikko in 1955. His meeting with André Weil at this symposium was to have a major influence on Taniyama's work. These problems form the basis of a conjecture: every elliptic curve defined over the rational field is a factor of the Jacobian of a modular function field. This conjecture proved to be a major component in the proof of Fermat's Last Theorem by Andrew Wiles.”

In 1986 Ken Ribet proved that if the Taniyama–Shimura conjecture held, then so would Fermat's Last Theorem, which inspired Andrew Wiles to work for a number of years in secrecy on it, and to prove enough of it to prove Fermat's Last Theorem. Owing to the pioneering contribution of Wiles and the efforts of a number of mathematicians, the Taniyama–Shimura conjecture was finally proven in 1999. The original Taniyama conjecture for elliptic curves over arbitrary number fields remains open.

Depression and death
In 1958, Taniyama worked for University of Tokyo as an assistant (joshu), was engaged, and was offered a position at the Institute for Advanced Study in Princeton, New Jersey. On 17 November 1958, Taniyama committed suicide. He left a note explaining how far he had progressed with his teaching duties, and apologizing to his colleagues for the trouble he was causing them. His suicide note read:
Until yesterday I had no definite intention of killing myself. But more than a few must have noticed that lately I have been tired both physically and mentally. As to the cause of my suicide, I don't quite understand it myself, but it is not the result of a particular incident, nor of a specific matter. Merely may I say, I am in the frame of mind that I lost confidence in my future. There may be someone to whom my suicide will be troubling or a blow to a certain degree. I sincerely hope that this incident will cast no dark shadow over the future of that person. At any rate, I cannot deny that this is a kind of betrayal, but please excuse it as my last act in my own way, as I have been doing my own way all my life.

Although his note is mostly enigmatic it does mention tiredness and a loss of confidence in his future. Taniyama's ideas had been criticized as unsubstantiated and his behavior had occasionally been deemed peculiar. Goro Shimura mentioned that he suffered from depression. Taniyama also mentioned in the note his concern that some might be harmed by his suicide and his hope that the act would not cast "a dark shadow over that person."

About a month later, Misako Suzuki, the woman whom he was planning to marry, also committed suicide by carbon monoxide poisoning, leaving a note reading:
"We promised each other that no matter where we went, we would never be separated. Now that he is gone, I must go too in order to join him."

After Taniyama's death, Goro Shimura stated that:
He was always kind to his colleagues, especially to his juniors, and he genuinely cared about their welfare. He was the moral support of many of those who came into mathematical contact with him, including of course myself. Probably he was never conscious of this role he was playing. But I feel his noble generosity in this respect even more strongly now than when he was alive. And yet nobody was able to give him any support when he desperately needed it. Reflecting on this, I am overwhelmed by the bitterest grief.

In a 2011 TED talk by English economist Tim Harford titled, "Trial, error and the God complex," Taniyama is referenced as a mathematician who was ultimately unable to prove his conjecture during his lifetime. Reflecting on Taniyama's work, Goro Shimura stated:
He was not a very careful person as a mathematician. He made a lot of mistakes. But he made mistakes in a good direction. I tried to imitate him. But I've realized that it's very difficult to make good mistakes.

See also

Taniyama group

Notes

Publications

 This book is hard to find, but an expanded version was later published as

References

 Singh, Simon (hardcover, 1998). Fermat's Enigma. Bantam Books.  (previously published under the title Fermat's Last Theorem).

External links
 

1927 births
1958 suicides
People from Saitama Prefecture
Japanese mathematicians
20th-century Japanese mathematicians
Number theorists
Japanese scientists
University of Tokyo alumni
Suicides in Japan
1958 deaths